Ghoufi, also known as the Rhoufi, Balconies of Ghoufi and Ghoufi Canyon, is a historic settlement in the village of T'kout in Batna Province, Algeria. These ruins are located in the Aures Mountains and Abiod Valley. The Balconies of Ghoufi overlook an oasis.

The Ghoufi balcony ruins include troglodyte homes or domesticated cave dwellings.  The homes are carved out of metamorphic and sedimentary rocks, including sandstone.  The home are four centuries old and were inhabited until the 1970s. The ruins preserve traditional and indigenous construction methods.

Ghoufi is included as part of the Parc des Aurès on UNESCO's Tentative List of World Heritage Sites.

See also
 List of cultural assets of Algeria
 List of archaeological sites by country

References

Populated places in Batna Province